Vieil-Hesdin is a commune in the Pas-de-Calais department in the Hauts-de-France region of France.

Geography
Vieil-Hesdin is situated 6 kilometres southeast of Hesdin, on the banks of the river Canche on the D 340 highway.

History
Once just simply known as Hesdin, this little village was, in the Middle Ages, a large and prosperous town. Its position in the heart of the county of Artois, once part of the Spanish Netherlands, led to its downfall.
From 1471 until its destruction in 1553, it suffered many sieges and sackings, as a result of fighting between the Kings of France, the Holy Roman Empire, Henry VIII of England and several French nobles.

The end of Hesdin, as it was then known, came at the hands of Charles V. His 60,000 strong army had already ravaged Metz and razed Thérouanne in April 1553 and he ordered the city and the castle completely destroyed. A month later, the wreckers had finished their work. Only the convent and chapel were spared.
Some months later, the demolition material was used to found a new city 6 kilometres downstream, at a village then called Maisnil. This new town took the name Hesdin-fert, then Hesdin-fort, eventually becoming Hesdin. The ruined town was known for a while as Hesdin-le-Châtel, then eventually as Vieil-Hesdin (Old-Hesdin).

Population

Places and monuments
 Château d'Estruval, 18th-19th century
 The former convent of the Black Nuns, now a château. The façade, roof and cloisters are protected by decree of July 9, 1981. The garden walls and buildings (including two pigeon houses) are also protected by decree of April 28, 1993.

See also
Communes of the Pas-de-Calais department

References

External links

 Association des Amis du site historique du vieil Hesdin

Vieilhesdin
Vieilhesdin
Artois